"The Trial of Henry Blake" is episode 8 from season 2 of the TV series M*A*S*H.

Synopsis
As the episode begins, Lt. Col. Henry Blake has been brought up on charges by Majors Frank Burns and Margaret Houlihan, the 4077th's second-in-command and head nurse. Both of them have been constantly butting heads with the colonel over his lack of military discipline and, consequently, what they believe is his unfitness for command. So, finally, they filed charges and Blake was brought before General Mitchell for a disciplinary hearing. As he and Radar left, Frank was caught smirking by his tentmates Hawkeye and Trapper, who warned them he might be in charge soon.

Among the misdeeds Blake is cited for:
conducting "gurney races" on the day of the Kentucky Derby, where doctors pushed nurses on reliable stretchers and bets were taken
allowing Radar to sell dress shoes door to door while in his off time
repeatedly failing to keep Cpl. Klinger from attempting to desert, most notably with the use of a homemade hang glider that made him look like "a big red bird with fuzzy pink feet"

Despite his position that his unit is run efficiently despite this, Mitchell orders Henry to be held under arrest. Radar is dispatched back to the 4077th.

Once there, Radar tells Hawkeye and Trapper what went down and that Henry is still facing one more serious charge: giving aid and comfort to the enemy, due to his assistance of an American nurse named Meg Cratty who operates a clinic within the North. This would mean treason charges against Blake, and Hawkeye and Trapper confront acting CO Frank over what he is doing.

After threatening to go to the hearing the next day with Nurse Cratty, Hawkeye and Trapper are placed under arrest and forced to sit on their beds stripped to their underwear. With assistance from Klinger, who drugs an MP, Hawkeye and Trapper commandeer a jeep and pick Nurse Cratty up, then bring her with them to the hearing much to the relief of Henry.

The specific charge against Henry involves the 4077th ordering more supplies than it needs or uses at his behest, with Henry then taking the overages and bringing them to Nurse Cratty's clinic. The nurse testifies that Henry's actions improved the quality of life for many women and babies in the area. Henry admits that he did somewhat fudge the requisitions, but the 4077th always had exactly what it needed to treat wounded soldiers and he did not allow his charitable efforts to negatively affect that.  "I'm guilty, that's my reason," Henry told the general, "so you can hang my butt from a flagpole."

Just then, the majors arrive having been delayed due to Frank taking a wrong turn. Frank points out to the hearing that Hawkeye and Trapper are both AWOL and Margaret says that whatever testimony they gave is not worth considering as they are two prime examples of Blake's unfitness for command. Henry responds by saying he is not a "junior General MacArthur", just a doctor trying to run a hospital and he does not care what the politics of his patient are.

After considering all sides, Mitchell is convinced not to bring the matter to trial. Frank, however, refuses to drop the charges against Henry. Hawkeye then writes a threatening note and shows it to Frank, who immediately withdraws the charges. He then shows it to Margaret, who acquiesces. The note was to Frank's wife, detailing the affair he is having with Margaret.

Trivia
In this episode "Nurse Meg Cratty" is played by Hope Summers; in M*A*S*H episode 4-8 "The Kids", Cratty is played by Ann Doran.

External links

References 

M*A*S*H (season 2) episodes
1973 American television episodes